Sapphic may refer to:

 Sappho, Greek poet of the 7th Century BC who wrote about her attraction to women
Sapphic stanza, a four line poetic form
 Sapphism, an inclusive umbrella term for attraction or relationships between women—whether they identify as lesbian, bi, pan, asexual, trans, non-binary or queer

See also
Sappho (disambiguation)
LGBT slang